Multiple SIDosis is a 1970 short film in which a single performer creates an entire multi-part performance of the song "Nola". It is an example of a kind of one-man-band musical performance.

Summary
Multiple SIDosis, written by, directed by and starred Sid Laverents, features as many as twelve split-screen "copies" of Laverents playing various conventional and improvised instruments simultaneously. The separately-recorded performances of the various parts were overdubbed and visually composited to create the final piece.

Technique
The overdubbing technique has been used before and since in professional recording studios, to allow a single performer to create an entire multi-instrument song. Digital technology has made the technique much easier for amateurs to employ today, but no such labour-saving devices were available to Laverents.

Legacy
In 2000, Multiple SIDosis was selected for preservation in the United States National Film Registry by the Library of Congress as being "culturally, historically, or aesthetically significant".

References

External links
 
 

1970 films
1970 short films
Amateur filmmaking
Films about music and musicians
United States National Film Registry films
1970s musical films